is a railway station and major stop along the Aoimori Railway Line in the city of Misawa in Aomori Prefecture, Japan. It is operated by the third sector railway operator Aoimori Railway Company.

Lines
Misawa Station is one of six principal stations served by the Aoimori Railway Line, and is 46.9 kilometers from the terminus of the line at Aomori Station. It is 664.2 kilometers from Tokyo Station.

Station layout
Misawa Station has one ground-level island platform and one ground-level side platform serving three tracks with an elevated station building built over the tracks. The station is staffed The station building has a ticket office, as well as automatic ticket machines.

Platforms

History
It became a station on the Tōhoku Main Line of Japanese Government Railways (JGR), the pre-war predecessor to the Japanese National Railways (JNR), when the Nippon Railway was nationalized on 1 July 1906. On 4 September 1922 it became a joint station, when the Towada Railway (present-day Towada Kankō Electric Railway, also known as Tōtetsu) connected Furumaki with Towadashi Station. The Tōtetsu Furumaki Station was relocated 120 meters away on 1 October 1926 and a new station building was completed on 1 January 1959. The Tōtetsu station was renamed Misawa Station on 1 March 1961 and the JNR station followed on 20 March of the same year. With the privatization of the JNR on 1 April 1987, the JNR Misawa Station came under the operational control of East Japan Railway Company (JR East) and Japan Freight Railway Company (JR Freight). Freight services were discontinued in June 2006. On 1 April 2012 Towada Kankō Electric Railway discontinued its railway business. The station building was expanded following the opening of a plaza extension on 4 April 2020.

Until the operational change in 2010, the JR station was served by the limited express trains Tsugaru, Hakuchō and Super Hakuchō.

Surrounding area
Aomori Prefectural Misawa Commercial High School
Komaki Onsen
Misawa Station Post Office

See also
 List of Railway Stations in Japan

Gallery

References

 JTB Timetable December 2010 issue

External links

Aoimori Railway station information page 

Railway stations in Japan opened in 1896
Railway stations in Aomori Prefecture
Aoimori Railway Line
Misawa, Aomori